Bernie O’Connor (born 1949 in Meelin, County Cork) is a former Irish hurling manager and former player.  He played hurling with his local club Meelin and with the Cork senior inter-county team in the 1960s and 1970s.  O’Connor later served as manager of the Kerry senior hurling team in the 2000s as well as being associated with the famous Newtownshandrum club.

Playing career

Club
O’Connor played his club hurling with his local Meelin club.  Although not a senior club it was still considered a hurling stronghold.  At the young age of thirteen his skill was apparent when he was chosen to line out on the Duhallow divisional team in the senior county championship.  With Meelin O’Connor won several divisional titles, however, a county title eluded him on two separate occasions.

Inter-county
O’Connor later became the first Meelin player to line out with Cork at all levels.  He first came to prominence in 1967 as a member of the Cork minor team.  That year he won a Munster minor title with his native county before later collecting an All-Ireland medal following a victory over Wexford.  O’Connor later lined out for Cork at under-21 and senior levels also, however, he had little success at these grades.

Managerial career

Newtownshandrum
In retirement from playing O’Connor maintained a keen interest in the game.  He became involved in coaching the local underage teams in his adopted club of Newtownshandrum.  As coach of the senior side he guided the club to their first ever senior county title in 2000.  Two years later O’Connor decided to take a step back and leave his coaching role with ‘Newtown’.  O’Connor remained on the sidelines of his club while his twin sons, Ben and Jerry, won a second county title in 2003.  This was quickly followed by both Munster and All-Ireland club titles.  In 2005 he was back as coach with Newtownshandrum.  That year he steered the club to a third county victory of the decade as well as a second Munster club victory.  His side were later outclassed by Portumna in the All-Ireland final.  O’Connor quit as coach following that defeat.

Kerry
In 2001, O'Connor took over as manager of the Kerry senior hurling team but had little success.

References

1949 births
Living people
Meelin hurlers
Duhallow hurlers
Cork inter-county hurlers
Hurling managers